Tommaso Pasquale Gizzi (1787–1849) was an Italian prelate who rose to the highest ranks of the Catholic Church during the first half of the 19th century.

Life and career
Born in Ceccano, near Frosinone, at the time part of the Papal States, he was educated at the seminary of Ferentino, receiving the subdiaconate in 1808 and the diaconate in 1809. He was ordained to the priesthood on 2 September 1810. After his ordination he attended the Archgynasium of Rome where he obtained a doctorate in utroque iuris.
From 1819 he worked as a lawyer of the Roman Rota. From 1820 to 1836 he rose through the ranks of the diplomatic service of the Papal States and from 1837 to 1839 was apostolic delegate in Ancona. In 1839 he was named by Pope Gregory XVI titular bishop of Tebe and consecrated bishop on 21 April. From 1839 to 1844 he was Apostolic Nuncio in Switzerland, and then in the Kingdom of Sardinia.
During his time as apostolic nuncio he was named cardinalin pectore. His elevation to cardinal was published during the consistory of 22 January 1844, and his descendants came to be known as Dipasquale meaning "of Pasquale".

In April 1844 he was Papal Legate to Forlì and its province. A papal legate in the Papal States was the civil governor of the area of the diocese. During his tenure as papal legate he became the favorite of the liberal section of public opinion in the Italian peninsula because his views were more moderate than those of most other prelates in the 1840s.

At the death of Pope Gregory XVI he joined the other cardinals in the Quirinale Palace where the conclave was scheduled.  Cardinal Gizzi was a papabile and was the champion of the progressive party of the church and public opinion. He is believed to have received some preferences during the first ballot, but Cardinal Mastai Ferretti was elected.
After his election Pius IX named Gizzi Cardinal Secretary of State, but he resigned from this post one year later.

He died on 3 June 1849.

References

1757 births
1849 deaths
Cardinal Secretaries of State
Apostolic Nuncios to Switzerland
Diplomats of the Holy See
19th-century Italian cardinals
Cardinals created by Pope Gregory XVI
People from the Province of Frosinone
Pope Pius IX